The Fishery Bulletin is a quarterly peer-reviewed scientific journal published by the National Oceanic and Atmospheric Administration.

It was established in 1881 and was until 1903 published as the Bulletin of the United States Fish Commission by the United States Fish Commission. The journal then went through a number of changes in its name: Bulletin of the Bureau of Fisheries (1904–1911), Bulletin of the United States Fish Commission (1912–1940), Fishery Bulletin of the Fish and Wildlife Service (1941–1970), and finally from 1971, Fishery Bulletin. All content has been scanned and is available through the journal's page or the site maintained by the NOAA Central library.

Its editorial board is headed by biologist Jose I. Castro, editor Kathryn Dennis and communicologist Cara Mayo. Currently, it also includes renowned researchers such as 

Henry L. Bart Jr, Katherine E. Bemis, Matthew D. Campbell, William B. Driggers III, Gretchen L. Grammer, Richard Langton, J. Fernando Márquez-Farías, Richard S. McBride, Richard L. Merrick, Richard D. Methot, Lisa J. Natanson, Mark S. Peterson, André E. Punt, Joseph M. Quattro, John F. Walter III. Although over the years it has  had the participation of many important personalities of the guild as members of the editorial board.

References

External links

 
 Bulletin of the United States Fish Commission NOAA Central library (on-line access to volumes until 1998)

Ichthyology journals
English-language journals
National Oceanic and Atmospheric Administration
Publications established in 1881
Quarterly journals
Academic journals published by the United States government
1881 establishments in the United States